Sazgar Engineering Works Limited is a Pakistani automotive manufacturer headquartered in Lahore, Pakistan. The company business is the manufacture and sale of automobiles, automotive parts and household electric appliances. 

In 2021, Sazgar announced teaming up with a Chinese automobile firm and to assemble cars in Pakistan. It has halted its expansion project, and decided to assemble cars in Pakistan. The New Automotive Policy in Pakistan has attracted many companies, such as Hyundai, Volkswagen, Kia. 

The company is spread on about 32 acres and is located on Raiwind Road in Lahore, Pakistan.

Pakistan’s first hybrid EV 
Haval HEV H6 vehicle is assembled in Pakistan and is its first hybrid electric vehicle. The vehicle is assembled under a joint venture of Sazgar Engineering Works Ltd and Great Wall Motor of China.

Operations in Pakistan 
In first quarter of 2023, Sazgar shut down its car manufacturing plants due to shortage of material in result of import restrictions in Pakistan. After 2 weeks of closure, the company resumed its manufacturing operations in the beginning of March.

Products 
The company made agreement with BAIC Group to launch of three vehicles in Pakistan which includes: 
BAIC D20 (Subcompact car)
BAIC X25 (Subcompact SUV)
BAIC BJ40 (Off-road SUV)

References

External links

 Official Sazgar website
 https://dps.psx.com.pk/company/SAZEW

Rickshaw manufacturers of Pakistan
Car manufacturers of Pakistan
Manufacturing companies based in Lahore
Vehicle manufacturing companies established in 1991
Pakistani companies established in 1991
Pakistani brands
Companies listed on the Pakistan Stock Exchange